St. John Henry Newman Catholic High School (also known as SJHNCHS, St. John Henry Newman CHS, St. John Henry Newman, colloquially referred to as Newman) is a Roman Catholic high school in  Toronto, Ontario, Canada. It was formerly known under its original name Cardinal Newman Catholic High School until 2011 and Blessed Cardinal Newman Catholic High School until 2019. It is located in the district of Scarborough, administered by the Toronto Catholic District School Board.

The school was founded in 1973 when the St. Augustine's Seminary decided to make use of extra classroom space as a result of its own declining student enrolment. The school was named after Saint John Henry Newman, a 19th-century English convert to Catholicism and prolific author. Located on a  campus, St. John Henry Newman Catholic High School overlooks a broad vista that contains both the Scarborough Bluffs and Lake Ontario. The motto for St. John Henry Newman is Growing in Faith and Truth.

History 
Roman Catholic secondary education in Scarborough started its roots when its first high school, Neil McNeil High School opened its doors in 1958 for boys while Notre Dame, a Catholic school for girls, opened in 1941 in which the pupils were bused to the two schools. However, nearby Scarborough Collegiate Institute was erected in 1922 as Scarborough's main high school at that time. Over the next several years, nearby elementary schools surrounding Newman were opened before and after the dawn of the Metropolitan Separate School Board (now today as the Toronto Catholic District School Board) were erected: St. Theresa Shrine of the Little Flower Separate School in 1952, Immaculate Heart of Mary Separate School in 1959 and St. Agatha Separate School in 1964.

The facility was built in 1962 as the college for St. Augustine's Seminary due to St. Michael's College lacking a downtown campus for St. Augustine's. The eastern residential wing of the college was demolished and was rebuilt as Cardinal Newman, opened on September 4, 1973 with the new building erected in 1976. In contrast with the schools opened by religious orders, Newman became the first co-educational public separate high school in the former city of Scarborough.

From the beginning, Cardinal Newman was staffed by Catholic lay teachers who were teaching exclusively. Cardinal Newman is one of only two high schools in MSSB to focus intently on an integration program for students with special needs. In addition, Cardinal Newman was in the forefront of programs like peer counseling, mediation, electronic keyboarding, and communications technology.

Cardinal Newman was at one time the only non-uniformed Roman Catholic High School in Metro Toronto. This was changed beginning in the late 1980s - early 1990s to conform with other local Catholic High Schools.

The school name was changed to Blessed Cardinal Newman in February 2011 following the beatification of John Henry Newman.

The original address for Newman was 2665 Kingston Road, the address was changed to 100 Brimley Road South in 2003 because the school signage and entrance had moved to the eastern side of the property as well as the driveway. The school's access continued to use the path via the adjacent St. Theresa Shine Catholic School.

In November 2018, the Canonization of Blessed Cardinal John Henry Newman was approved. His Canonization took place on October 13, 2019. It was expected that once he gets canonized, the school's name would be promptly readjusted, similar to other schools in the TCDSB such as St. John Paul II Catholic Secondary School, St. Mother Teresa Catholic Academy, St. Oscar Romero Catholic Secondary School, St. Kateri Tekakwitha Catholic School, St. John XXIII Catholic School and St. Marguerite Bourgeoys Catholic School.

Replacement school
St. John Henry Newman is one of the oldest buildings within the Toronto Catholic District School Board that needs massive repairs due to aging infrastructure and harsh weather. The structures built in 1964 and 1976 was originally built to house 666 pupils in capacity and requires some 70% of the building's components to be replaced. Initially, 14 portables with a portapak were scattered across the school to ease perpetual overcrowding with the population doubled its size. In 2008, the portables were realigned to create an extra parking space. Twelve replacement surplus portables came from the Regina Pacis compound and the remaining eight from James Cardinal McGuigan Catholic High School, which constructed an addition at the time totaling to 20 portables.

On November 9, 2015, The Ontario Government announced to spend $30 million to construct a modern, state-of-the-art school with learning spaces for 1,110 students. It will be built on the neighbouring property of Scarboro Foreign Mission Society, which will be closing their doors sometime in the early 2020s. Demolition will take place thereafter, and construction of the new school is expected to begin shortly afterwards, with completion of the new school on January 6, 2025.

Athletics 
St. John Henry Newman offers a multitude of sport teams to join from, in addition, there are recreational clubs that are offered after-school.

Sports

 Basketball
 Soccer
 Volleyball
 Rugby 7's
 Rugby Union
 Cricket
 Badminton
 Ultimate Frisbee
 Baseball
 Swimming
 Tennis
 Table Tennis
 Badminton
 Golf
 Cross Country
 Track and Field

Notable alumni 

Eric Bauza – voice actor
Michael Bunting – ice hockey player
Mike Duco – ice hockey player
Julian de Guzman – soccer player
Francis Manapul – DC Comics writer
Dominic Oppong – soccer player
Ryan O'Reilly – ice hockey player
Noah Skirrow – baseball player
Francesco Yates – recording artist

See also 
List of high schools in Ontario
St. Augustine's Seminary

References

External links 
 

Toronto Catholic District School Board
High schools in Toronto
Catholic secondary schools in Ontario
Educational institutions established in 1973
Burials at St. Augustine's Seminary
Beaux-Arts architecture in Canada
1973 establishments in Ontario
Education in Scarborough, Toronto